Exmouth Lifeboat Station is the base for Royal National Lifeboat Institution (RNLI) search and rescue operations at Exmouth, Devon, England. The first lifeboat was stationed in the town in 1803 and the present station was opened in 2009. In 2014 a new  25-knot all-weather boat (ALB) went on station.

History

Vessels trying to reach Topsham and Exeter have to negotiate the sandbanks at the mouth of the River Exe. Local people raised funds with the help of Lloyd's of London to purchase a lifeboat in 1803. A boathouse was built near Passage House but this was washed away in a storm in 1814. The RNLI revived Exmouth Lifeboat Station in 1858. A new boathouse was built near the beach, although the lifeboat had to be taken across the road before it could be launched. This boathouse was demolished and a new one built on the same site in 1903 to accommodate a larger lifeboat. The first motor lifeboat at Exmouth arrived in 1933 and a tractor was provided to speed up the movement across the road and beach for launches.

Exmouth received brand new  Maria Noble on 1 October 1953 but it was not named until 1 September 1954. Her first service call was on the evening 19 September 1954 to investigate flashing lights and shouts for help near the Maer Rocks. The lifeboat secretary and coxswain lit up the scene with a car's headlights and they saw the  cabin cruiser Nicky which was at anchor but appeared to be sinking. The tide was too low to reach it with the lifeboat, but as soon as the water had risen sufficiently it was launched. Even now the lifeboat touched the bottom in the troughs between waves. The lifeboat took on board all the people from the Nicky and returned to station just 26 minutes after being launched. Coxswain Harold 'Dido' Bradford was awarded the RNLI Bronze Medal for bravery during this rescue.

From 1961 the lifeboat was kept afloat in the river near the entrance to Exmouth docks. A boarding boat was kept on a davit that was lowered into the water to ferry the crew out to the lifeboat. The old lifeboat station by the beach was retained as a fund-raising display centre and, from 1966, was the base for an inshore lifeboat. The building used by crews at the docks was demolished in 1996 and replaced by temporary portable buildings. In 2005 trials were made to consider whether it would be possible to return the all-weather boat to the beach boathouse where it would not be hampered by shallow water in the river when it was needed at low tide. As a result of this it was decided to build a new boathouse further along the beach near the Maer Rocks from where both the ALB and ILB could operate at all states of the tide. The  was exchanged for an interim  which is small enough to be housed in a boathouse, and the new facility was declared operational on 21 November 2009. The Shannon class lifeboat replaced the Mersey and reestablished the 25knot service. The old boathouse was retained as a base for the RNLI lifeguards who work in and around Exmouth. until being handed back to Clinton devon estates, now used by Exmouth Rowing Club.

A new D-class inshore lifeboat arrived in 2017.

Will Carder

William J Carder was born in 1903 and volunteered for the Exmouth lifeboat crew in June 1953. He earned a living running The Volunteer public house.

The lifeboat launched at 5:20 pm into a Force 6 to 8 wind and  waves. About 10 minutes out a large wave pushed the boat far over onto her side and the radio aerial was also damaged. Will Carder was near the front of the boat with two colleagues at the time and told them that he was going aft to get some shelter. Another large wave then broke over the boat. Although no one saw it happen, this is believed to be when Will Carder was swept overboard. Brian Rowsell was trying to repair the aerial and was knocked into the mast and sustained a head injury. A few minutes later Second Coxswain Jack Phillips was also washed overboard.

Coxswain Harold 'Dido' Bradford took the decision to continue to the ship that was in distress. To turn the lifeboat around to search for the missing men would have been extremely difficult and dangerous in that storm. While the main radio was inoperable, a message was broadcast on the wavelength used by trawlers and this was picked up in Exmouth and relayed to the lifeboat station. A search was got underway along the beaches. Jack Phillips was found staggering in the surf. He was helped up the cliff and taken to hospital. The body of Will Carder was later found nearby.

The lifeboat reached the Minerva at 6:45. They found that the engines had failed and the anchor was barely holding. They stood by until 8 o'clock when the Torbay Lifeboat Geore Shee arrived to take over. Sea conditions made it difficult to return to their station so they sailed instead to Torquay where Brian Rowsell was taken to hospital to have his injuries seen to. The crew stayed here to rest and then returned home at 2 pm on Boxing Day, the RNLI flag flying at half mast.

Description
The lifeboat station is built at the eastern end of Queen's Drive at the top of the beach. The building contains two separate boathouses for the ILB and ALB and has a short concrete ramp that leads down to the beach. Each boat is kept on a carriage attached to a tractor which propels it down to the water and brings it back after use. A fund-raising shop is situated on the east side, while crew facilities are at first floor level.

Area of operation
Inshore area of operation includes the river Exe up to the city of Exeter.

Fleet

Pulling and sailing lifeboats

Motor lifeboats

Inshore lifeboats

See also
 List of RNLI stations

References

External links

 Official station website
 RNLI station information

Lifeboat stations in Devon
Exmouth